Sobarocephala latifrons is a species of fly in the family Clusiidae.

References

Insects described in 1860
Articles created by Qbugbot
Clusiidae